Anthony Davis (born 1993) is an American basketball player for the Los Angeles Lakers of the NBA.

Anthony Davis may also refer to:

Sports
 Anthony Davis (cricketer) (1931–1978), English cricketer
 Anthony Davis (linebacker) (born 1969), American football linebacker
 Anthony Davis (offensive tackle, born 1980), American football offensive lineman
 Anthony Davis (offensive tackle, born 1989), American football offensive lineman
 Anthony Davis (running back, born 1952), American football running back, USC
 Anthony Davis (running back, born 1982), running back in the Canadian Football League

Music
 Anthony Davis (composer) (born 1951), American composer and jazz pianist
 Anthony Davis, known as Ant (1970), American hip-hop producer
 Anthony Davis, known as Beenie Man (born 1973), Jamaican dancehall reggae musician
 Anthony Davis, bass player for Ruby (rock band)

Other
 Anthony Davis (comedian) (born 1974), British comedian and radio presenter
 Anthony Norman Davis (1918–1988), British Royal Air Force officer

See also
 Tony Davis (disambiguation)
 Anthony Davies (disambiguation)
 Antonio Davis (born 1968), American former basketball player
 Antonio Davis (boxer) (born 1972), American boxer